Kamiakin and its variants Comiaken, Kamiakan, and Ka-mi-akin, may refer to:

Chief Kamiakin (1800–1877), chief and war-leader of the Yakama
Chief Kamiakin Elementary School, in Sunnyside, Washington
Kamiakin High School, in Kennewick, Washington
Kamiakin Junior High, a middle school in Kirkland, Washington

Kamiakin's Gardens, a Registered Historic Place located in Union Gap, Washington
The name is often shortened to Kamiak, which is used in other place names, including:
 Kamiak High School, in Mukilteo, Washington
 Kamiak Butte, a summit in Whitman County, Washington